Pablo Dacal (30 June 1886–1961) was a Uruguayan footballer. He played in 29 matches for the Uruguay national football team from 1908 to 1916. He was also part of Uruguay's squad for the 1916 South American Championship.

References

External links
 

1886 births
Date of death missing
Uruguayan footballers
Uruguay international footballers
Association football midfielders
Club Nacional de Football players
Club Atlético River Plate (Montevideo) players
Montevideo Wanderers F.C. players